Cimetta is a mountain in the Lepontine Alps, it is located above Locarno and Lake Maggiore.

The Locarno–Madonna del Sasso funicular links Locarno city centre with Orselina. From there a cable car connects to Cardada, from which a chair lift runs to the summit.

Climate

See also
List of mountains of Switzerland accessible by public transport

External links 
 Cardada and Cimetta cable car

References

Mountains of the Alps
Mountains of Ticino
Cable cars in Switzerland
Lepontine Alps
Mountains of Switzerland